The Bob Marshall Wilderness Area is a congressionally-designated wilderness area located in Western Montana region of the United States. It is named after Bob Marshall (1901–1939), an early forester in the federal government, conservationist, and co-founder of The Wilderness Society. In the 1930s while working for the Forest Service, Marshall was largely responsible for designation of large areas to be preserved as roadless within lands administered by the Forest Service; he achieved this through promulgation of various regulations.

As directed by the Wilderness Act of 1964, "The Bob", as it is informally known, is to remain roadless. The only permanent structures here are some old ranger stations and horse bridges. "The Bob" is the fifth-largest wilderness in the lower 48 states (after the Death Valley Wilderness, Frank Church—River of No Return Wilderness, Selway-Bitterroot Wilderness, and Marjory Stoneman Douglas Wilderness). The five ranger districts administering "The Bob" manage  of trail that are open to foot and stock use only.

Description
"The Bob", as it is known by locals and nicknamed by the U.S. Forest Service employees, ranges in altitudes of 4,000 to more than 9,000 feet (1,220 to 2750 m). With numerous waterfalls, lakes, and dense forests, the wilderness is prime Grizzly bear habitat; the U.S. Forest Service claims that the population density of this species is higher in "The Bob" than can be found anywhere else in the U.S. outside of the Greater Yellowstone Ecosystem or Alaska. The Bob is also home to many other large mammals, such as moose, elk, black bear, mountain goat, bighorn sheep, wolverine, cougar, Canadian lynx, and wolf. Bald eagles, osprey, pelican, and trumpeter swan are just a few of the bird species found. The dense old-growth forests are dominated by Douglas fir, larch, and spruce. Forest fires have changed large areas in the wilderness complex in recent years.

Wilderness areas do not allow motorized or mechanical equipment, including bicycles and hang-gliders. Camping and fishing are allowed; fishing requires a state license. There are no roads and there is no logging or mining, in compliance with the Wilderness Act. Some administrative cabins constructed in the early 1920s afford refuge for trail crews and wilderness rangers. Wilderness areas within National Forests and Bureau of Land Management areas allow hunting in season.

Surroundings

The wilderness, along with the adjoining Scapegoat and Great Bear wildernesses, make up the Bob Marshall Wilderness Complex, with components administered by the Lolo, Flathead, Helena, and Lewis and Clark National Forests, respectively. All three wildernesses total .

The wilderness is located in parts of Flathead, Lewis and Clark, Powell, Teton, Missoula, and Pondera counties, and lies mostly within Flathead National Forest (70.3%) and partially within Lewis and Clark National Forest. The wilderness can be accessed by trails (via foot travel or on horseback) from surrounding roads.

U.S. Route 2 is to the north and separates the Bob Marshall Wilderness Complex from Glacier National Park. U.S. 89 and 287 are to the east, and Montana highways 200 and 83 are to the south and west. Popular points of entry from the west are located near the communities of Swan Lake, Seeley Lake, Lincoln, and Hungry Horse. From the east, the Bob Marshall Wilderness is accessible from Augusta, Choteau and Dupuyer.

History
The wilderness was administratively created in 1940 from the South Fork, Pentagon, and Sun River Primitive Areas (which were designated in the 1930s). Passage of the Wilderness Act in 1964 provided for this wilderness to become part of the National Wilderness Preservation System.

The wilderness is named in honor of Bob Marshall, a forester with the U.S. Forest Service (USFS). During the 1930s, he ensured the promulgation of regulations to protect such areas by designating as roadless large areas within lands administered by the USFS.

See also

 Bob Marshall Wilderness Complex
 Continental Divide Trail
 List of largest wilderness areas in the United States
 Montana Wilderness Association

References

Further reading

External links

 The Bob Marshall Wilderness Foundation website - Wilderness Volunteer Projects in The Bob
 
 
 
 

Protected areas of Flathead County, Montana
IUCN Category Ib
Protected areas of Lewis and Clark County, Montana
Protected areas of Missoula County, Montana
Protected areas of Pondera County, Montana
Protected areas of Powell County, Montana
Protected areas of Teton County, Montana
Wilderness areas of Montana
Lewis and Clark National Forest
Lolo National Forest
Helena National Forest
Flathead National Forest
1964 establishments in Montana
Protected areas established in 1964